Biareolifera is a genus of moths of the family Noctuidae. It contains only one species, Biareolifera geometriformis, which is found in Cameroon, the Democratic Republic of Congo (Orientale), Ghana and Nigeria.

References

External links
Natural History Museum Lepidoptera genus database

Calpinae
Monotypic moth genera